Where It's At is an album by the American soul group the Holmes Brothers, released in 1991.

Production
The album was produced by Scott Billington and Andy Breslau. It includes covers of songs written by, among others, Hank Williams and Sam Cooke, as well as originals penned by Wendell Holmes and Paul Kelly. The album liner notes were written by Vernon Reid.

Critical reception

The Washington Post thought that "as singers, the brothers Holmes—Wendell and Sherman—tend to go in opposite directions, taking the high and low roads as they merge soul and gospel traditions, drawing inspiration and passion from both." The Orlando Sentinel wrote that "the blend between the brothers' gritty voices and [Popsy] Dixon's celestial falsetto is pure soul." 

The New York Times called the album "a strange and beguiling mixture of bar-band blues, soul, funk, gospel and country music." The St. Petersburg Times opined that "although it recalls Stax/Volt in spots, the disc is not a museum piece." Stereo Review panned the "utterly awful, ear-wrenching voice of Wendell Holmes."

Track listing

Personnel
Willie "Popsy" Dixon - drums, vocals
Sherman Holmes - bass, vocals
Wendell Holmes - guitar, vocals
Jon Cleary - keyboards
Gib Wharton - pedal steel
Hell's Kitchen Horns - horns

References

1991 albums
Rounder Records albums